Aaron Matson (1770 – July 18, 1855) was a United States representative from New Hampshire.  He was born in Plymouth, Massachusetts. He moved to Cheshire County, New Hampshire, where he was the county judge of probate.

Matson was a member of the New Hampshire House of Representatives 1806–1808, 1810–1814, 1817, and 1818, and a member of the Executive Council 1819–1821. He was elected as a Democratic-Republican to the Seventeenth Congress and reelected as an Adams-Clay Republican to the Eighteenth Congress (March 4, 1821 – March 3, 1825). After leaving Congress, he was again a member of the New Hampshire House of Representatives in 1827 and 1828. He died in Newport, Vermont in 1855.

References

Aaron Matson (1770–1855)

1770 births
1855 deaths
People from Plymouth, Massachusetts
Democratic-Republican Party members of the United States House of Representatives from New Hampshire
Members of the New Hampshire House of Representatives